Saïd M'Roumbaba (born 14 January 1979), better known by his stage name Soprano, is a French Comorian rapper, singer and songwriter. He is a part of the rap group Psy 4 de la Rime. After leaving the group to make his first solo album. He recorded his solo debut Puisqu'il Faut Vivre which made the Billboard European Top 100. He returned in 2010 with a new solo album called La Colombe, which included collaborations with numerous artists such as Indila and Amadou & Mariam. He has continued to work with Psy4 de la Rime: their third album, Les Cités d'Or, was released in 2008, and their fourth album 4eme Dimension came out in April 2013.

On 19 September 2019, Soprano entered at the Musée Grévin. His wax statue wears a hat signed by De Bornarel, a Karl Lagerfeld jacket and Aaron Jah Stone jewellery; the outfit is the one he wore at the NRJ Music Awards 2018 ceremony. "We kept this outfit, we thought it mixed The Voice, my career, the scene... it summed it up well" he told France 3.

Discography

Studio albums

Live albums

Mixtapes

Other albums

Singles

As lead artist

*Did not appear in the official Belgian Ultratop 50 charts, but rather in the bubbling under Ultratip charts.

As featured artist

*Did not appear in the official Belgian Ultratop 50 charts, but rather in the bubbling under Ultratip charts.

Other charted songs

Collaborations and mixtapes
 2000
Psy 4 De La Rime - La Pluie D'Un Desert sur la B.O. du film Comme un aimant
Soprano Feat Sako - Pour de meilleurs... sur la mixtape Sad Hill Impact
Psy 4 De La Rime - La fierté sur la mixtape Sad Hill Impact
Psy 4 De La Rime - Pour mes gens sur la mixtape Sad Hill Impact
45 Niggaz Feat Psy 4 De La Rime - Mon Micro Et Mon Glaive sur l'album de 45 Niggaz, Les guerriers de Mars

 2001
Psy 4 De La Rime - Le départ sur la mixtape Sur un air positif
Soprano - Sugar sur la B.O. du film Comme un aimant

 2002
Akhenaton Feat Soprano - Paranoia sur l'album d'Akh, Black Album

 2003
IAM Feat Soprano - La Violence sur l'album d'IAM, Revoir un printemps
Psy 4 de La Rime - L'assemblee sur la mixtape TSE Music Vol.1
45 Niggaz Feat Soprano - 5 éléments sur l'album de 45 Niggaz, Justice Sauvage

 2004
La Swija Feat Soprano - En bas sur l'album de La Swija, Des racines et des ailes
La Swija Feat Psy 4 De La Rime - Au sourire levant sur l'album de La Swija, Des racines et des ailes
Soprano - S.O.P.R.A. sur la mixtape Têtes Brulées
Soprano Feat L'algérino & Kalash - Réseaux Pas Hallal sur la mixtape Street Lourd Hall Stars
Kery James Feat Soprano & Rohff - La Force sur la mixtape Savoir Et Vivre Ensemble
Psy 4 De La Rime - L'Assemblée sur la mixtape TSE Music
Bouchées Double Feat Psy 4 De La Rime - Micro trottoir sur le EP de Bouchées Double, Matière grise
Soprano Feat Mino - L'enfer du devoir sur la mixtape Projet Ares
Psy 4 De La Rime - Marseillais sur la mixtape OM All Stars
Beretta Feat Soprano - Animaux dans les mots sur l'album de Beretta, Rimes 2 Zone
Beretta Feat Soprano & L'algerino - Aussi Profond que l'ocean sur l'album de Beretta, Rimes 2 Zone

 2005
L'algérino Feat Soprano - Etoile D'un Jour sur l'album de L'algérino, Les Derniers Seront Les Premiers
L'algérino Feat Psy 4 De La Rime & IAM - M.A.R.S. sur l'album de L'algérino, Les Derniers Seront Les Premiers
Medine Feat Soprano - Anéanti sur l'album de Médine, Jihad
Psy 4 De La Rime - Lova sur la mixtape Illicite Projet
Psy 4 De La Rime Feat Mystik & Mino - J'reste au front sur la mixtape Hematom Resurrection
Soprano - Fréro tiens l'coup sur la mixtape Haute Tension
Psy 4 De La Rime - De la paix a la haine sur la mixtape Neochrome Vol.3
Soprano Feat Mino & La Swija - Stallag 13 sur la mixtape Stallag 13
Soprano Feat Mino - On est les autres sur la mixtape Stallag 13
Soprano Feat Cesare - Freestyle radio sur la mixtape Stallag 13
Soprano Feat Vincenzo - Bootleg sur la mixtape Rap Performance

 2006
Akhenaton Feat Psy 4 De La Rime - Vue De La Cage sur l'album d'Akh, Soldats De Fortune
Psy 4 De La Rime - Bienvenue A Massilia sur la mixtape Mixtape Evolution
Soprano Feat Sako & Akhenaton - Tant Que Dieu... sur la mixtape La Cosca Team Vol.2
Psy 4 De La Rime - Fou sur la mixtape La Cosca Team Vol.2
La Cosca Team - La Ronde sur la mixtape, La Cosca Team Vol.2
Kayna Samet Feat Soprano - Besoin De Renaître sur l'album de Kayna Samet, Entre Deux Je
Soprano - Moi J'Ai Pas sur la mixtape Hostile 2006
Soprano - Mars Vice sur la mixtape Illégal Radio
Moubaraka Feat Soprano - Espérance sur le Street CD de Moubaraka, L'envie de percer
Psy 4 De La Rime Feat Le Rat Luciano, L'algérino & Bouga - Marseille all star sur la mixtape Crise des banlieues
Soprano Feat L.E.A - Derniere Chance sur la mixtape Block 4 Life
Soprano Feat Médine - Ils Disent sur la mixtape Block 4 Life
Psy 4 De La Rime - La Cosco sur la mixtape Independenza Labels
Psy 4 De La Rime - Paix à la haine sur la mixtape 1Konito Vol.3
Samat Feat Soprano - Réfléchi sur l'album de Samat, Just Milieu
Larsen Feat Soprano - Dis leur sur le Street CD de Larsen, Dark Album: En Parallele
Soprano - Au-dela des codes postaux sur la mixtape Dans les rues de Marseille

 2007
S.Teban Feat Soprano & Segnor Alonzo - The World Needs You sur la mixtape, TSE Music L'Apéro
Tony P Feat Soprano & Don Choa - Les Clés De La Reussite sur l'album éponyme de Tony P
K.ommando Toxic Feat Soprano & Tonino - Au taquet sur le Street CD du K.ommando Toxic, Cocktail explosif
Psykopat Feat Soprano - Qui sur le Street CD des Psykopat, Antholopsy
Melissa Feat Soprano - Jour de pluie sur l'album de Melissa, Avec tout mon amour
Kalash L'afro Feat Soprano - Armadeus & Ghettoven sur l'album de Kalash, Cracheur de flammes

 2009
La Fouine feat Soprano & Sefyu - Ca fait mal

 2010
Soprano feat Afrob, Skero & Greis - Starting Block (Juice Remix) Exklusive for the German Rap Mag CD
ZPU (Spanish rapper) feat Soprano - Primera Clase
Delahoja (Spanish par group) feat Soprano - Nuestra B.S.O.

 2011
Fabri Fibra featuring Redman and Soprano - Rap Futuristico (Tranne Te Remix)
C'est ma life featuring DJ Abdel
BET Hip Hop Awards 2011 Cypher

 2012
Sadek feat Soprano Au bout du chemin
Redk feat Soprano Meskine and Avant de s'en aller

References 

1979 births
Living people
French male singers
French people of Comorian descent
French hip hop musicians
Musicians from Marseille
Rappers from Bouches-du-Rhône